Shyamal Sinha, also known as Shyamlal Sinha, (10 July 1930 – 7 June 1963) was an Indian  first-class cricketer and cricket coach.

Sinha played regularly for Bihar from 1951-52 to 1962-63 as a bowler. His best figures were 4 for 82 off 29 overs against Bengal in 1958-59. His highest score was 34 not out at number nine, the second-top score of the innings, in a close victory over Orissa in 1960-61.

While teaching at his alma mater, Patna University, in the 1950s, he and some of his colleagues, including Sujit Mukherjee, began informally coaching local boys and promoting cricket in Patna. Sinha was appointed state cricket coach by the Bihar government, a position he held until his early death. The cricket competition among Bihar schools has since been held for the Shyamal Sinha Memorial Trophy.

References

External links
 Shyamlal Sinha at CricketArchive
 

1930 births
1963 deaths
Indian cricketers
Cricketers from Patna
Patna University alumni
Bihar cricketers
Indian cricket coaches